The following is a list of films produced in the Kannada film industry in India in 1998, presented in alphabetical order.

References

External links
 http://www.bharatmovies.com/kannada/info/moviepages.htm
 http://www.kannadastore.com/

See also 

 Kannada films of 1997
 Kannada films of 1999

1998
Lists of 1998 films by country or language
 Kannada
1998 in Indian cinema